The Memphis Xplorers were a professional arena football team.  They were a 2001 expansion member of the af2.  They played their home games at DeSoto Civic Center in Southaven, Mississippi (a suburb of Memphis, Tennessee).  The team's logo featured the likeness of the namesake of both the venue and the team, Spanish explorer Hernando de Soto.

On October 11, 2006, the team announced that they would not return for the 2007 season.

In October 2007, local teacher Patrick Smith and a partner purchased the Memphis Xplorers for $100,000. There were plans to bring the team back for the 2009 season, with the possibility of the team's name being changed to the Midsouth Mafia.  These plans never came to fruition.

Season-by-season

|-
|2001 || 3 || 13 || 0 || 7th NC South Central || --
|-
|2002 || 5 || 11 || 0 || 4th NC Central || --
|-
|2003 || 6 || 10 || 0 || 3rd NC Central || --
|-
|2004 || 10 || 6 || 0 || 2nd AC Mid-South || Lost Round 1 (Florida 35, Memphis 33)
|-
|2005 || 13 || 3 || 0 || 1st NC Midwest || Won Round 2 (Memphis 71, Amarillo 30) Won National Conference Championship (Memphis 58, Rio Grande Valley 49) Won ArenaCup VI (Memphis 63, Louisville 41)
|-
|2006 || 11 || 5 || 0 || 2nd AC Southern || Won Round 1 (Memphis 83, Louisville 61) Lost Round 2 (Green Bay 67, Memphis 50)
|-
!Totals || 52 || 50 || 0
|colspan="2"| (including playoffs)
|}

References

External links 
 Memphis Xplorers on ArenaFan.com

Xplorers
American football teams in Tennessee
DeSoto County, Mississippi
Defunct af2 teams
Sports in Southaven, Mississippi
American football teams established in 2001
American football teams disestablished in 2006
2001 establishments in Mississippi
2006 disestablishments in Mississippi